The Silver Slugger Award is awarded annually to the best offensive player at each position in both the American League (AL) and the National League (NL), as determined by the coaches and managers of Major League Baseball (MLB). These voters consider several offensive categories in selecting the winners, including batting average, slugging percentage, and on-base percentage, in addition to "coaches' and managers' general impressions of a player's overall offensive value". Managers and coaches are not permitted to vote for players on their own team. The Silver Slugger was first awarded in 1980 and is given by Hillerich & Bradsby, the manufacturer of Louisville Slugger bats. The award is a bat-shaped trophy, 3 feet (91 cm) tall, engraved with the names of each of the winners from the league and plated with sterling silver.

As with the Rawlings Gold Glove Award, the prize is presented to outfielders irrespective of their specific position. This means that it is possible for three left fielders, or any other combination of outfielders, to win the award in the same year, rather than one left fielder, one center fielder, and one right fielder. It is also possible for outfield teammates to win the award in the same season, which has happened eight times since 1980.

Among outfielders and among all Silver Slugger winners, Barry Bonds has won the most awards, winning twelve times between 1990 and 2004. All of his awards were won in the National League. Manny Ramirez leads the American League with eight wins. Ken Griffey Jr., Vladimir Guerrero, Tony Gwynn and Mike Trout have each won seven Silver Sluggers in the outfield; Juan González, Kirby Puckett and Sammy Sosa have won six times. Three players have won five times (Albert Belle, Ryan Braun and Dave Winfield), and four-time winners include Andre Dawson, Matt Holliday, Andrew McCutchen, Dale Murphy and Gary Sheffield. There have also been 11 three-time outfield winners and 24 two-time awardees. The most recent winners are Nick Castellanos, Bryce Harper, and Juan Soto in the National League, and Teoscar Hernández, Aaron Judge, and Cedric Mullins in the American League.

Gwynn posted the highest batting average in an outfielder's winning season, batting .394 in the 1994 season before it was truncated by the players' strike. Magglio Ordóñez' 2007 average is the best in the American League (.363). Bonds, the overall leader, holds three records: on-base percentage (.609 in 2004), slugging percentage (.863 in 2001) and home runs (73 in 2001). The American League leaders in those categories include Belle (.714 slugging percentage in 1994), Griffey (56 home runs in 1997 and 1998), and Trout (.460 on-base percentage in 2018). Ramírez also leads both leagues in runs batted in (RBI) during an outfielder's winning season, with 165 in 1999. Sosa is the National League leader (160 RBI in 2001).

Key

American League winners

National League winners

References

Inline citations

External links
Louisville Slugger – The Silver Slugger Award

Silver Slugger Award
Awards established in 1980